Tales of Tomorrow is an American anthology science fiction series that was performed and broadcast live on ABC from 1951 to 1953. The series covered such stories as Frankenstein starring Lon Chaney Jr., 20,000 Leagues Under the Sea starring Thomas Mitchell as Captain Nemo, and many others.

Cast
Besides Chaney and Mitchell, the show featured such performers as Boris Karloff, James Dean, Brian Keith, Lee J. Cobb, Eva Gabor, Veronica Lake, Rod Steiger, Bruce Cabot, Franchot Tone, Louis Hector, Gene Lockhart, Walter Abel, Cloris Leachman, Leslie Nielsen, Joanne Woodward and Paul Newman. The series had many similarities to the later Twilight Zone which also covered one of the same stories, "What You Need". In total it ran for eighty-five 30-minute episodes.  It was called “the best science-fiction fare on TV today” by Paul Fairman, editor of If.

Production
The idea for this science fiction television series was developed by Theodore Sturgeon and Mort Abrahams, and presented under the auspices of the Science Fiction League of America. This entity, not to be confused with the Science Fiction League, may have been a creation of the producers; author Robert Heinlein was contacted in 1951 by Sturgeon and Abrahams about their plan to "put together a league of s-f authors to write television screenplays for a new proposed TV series, Tomorrow is Yours (the original title of the show)." A deal was struck with Richard Gordon and George Foley, giving the producers of the show first choice of any of the 2,000 short stories and 13 novels by the various members of the League.

Tales of Tomorrow was the first dramatized showcase for several authors, including Arthur C. Clarke. Other early science fiction writers whose work was reflected in the series included Fredric Brown ("The Last Man on Earth" and "Age of Peril"), Philip Wylie ("Blunder"), C. M. Kornbluth ("The Little Black Bag") and Stanley G. Weinbaum ("The Miraculous Serum"). The show was intended for adults; at the time, most science fiction productions were targeted to children. The producers wanted to blend mystery and science fiction, and to emphasize fast pacing and suspense.

Episodes

Series overview

Season 1 (1951–52)

Season 2 (1952–53)

Radio series
While the television series was still being produced in 1953, ABC ran a radio show of the same name from January 1 to April 9, 1953. The radio series differed from the television series in that its scripts were adapted from stories appearing in Galaxy Science Fiction. Another radio series, Dimension X, had had a similar relationship with Astounding Science Fiction magazine.

The radio series was not successful. After only a few episodes, on February 26 it moved to CBS for the remainder of its 15-episode run. The TV version was canceled shortly afterward (the last episode was shown on June 12, 1953). A few years after its cancellation, the radio series X Minus One (a 1955 revival of Dimension X) debuted, again adapting stories published in Galaxy. Four of the fifteen Tales of Tomorrow stories were later adapted for X Minus One. These were "The Stars Are the Styx", "The Moon Is Green", "The Girls from Earth", and "The Old Die Rich".

Release to public domain episodes
Most of the TV episodes are in the United States public domain. Additionally, five of the surviving radio series episodes are now in the public domain in the United States and available for free download at Internet Archive. Live TV episodes were captured on kinescope. Of the 85 TOT episodes produced, around 40 have been released on various DVD sets, along with another handful on VHS, which for years was the only place to find “A Child Is Crying”, one of the most memorable episodes of the series<ref>[https://www.sandiegoreader.com/news/2020/apr/25/tales-tomorrow-inside-story-tvs-1st-sci-fi-antholo/ Tales Of Tomorrow: The Inside Story on TV's 1st Sci-Fi Anthology], website;</ref>

See also
 Captain Video and His Video Rangers, first science fiction adventure series in United States television. It was aimed at juvenile audiences.
 Out There, a 1951 anthology series.
 Science fiction on television, a look at the history of science fiction from various countries, and when they first appeared on television.
 Science Fiction Theatre, an anthology series released about three years later.
 Space Patrol'', a science fiction adventure series that was being produced at the same time, aimed at juvenile audiences.

References

External links
 
 
 List of Tales of Tomorrow television episodes, and link to radio series collection on Internet Archive.
 Tales of Tomorrow: Radio collection, 5 episodes from the radio series available for free download at the Internet Archive.
 Tales of Tomorrow episode guide.
 OTR Plot Spot: Tales of Tomorrow - plot summaries and reviews.
Tales of Tomorrow at CVTA with episode list
Tales of Tomorrow: The Inside Story interviews with show creators

1950s American science fiction television series
1951 American television series debuts
1953 American television series endings
1950s American anthology television series
American Broadcasting Company original programming
American radio dramas
1953 radio programme debuts
1953 radio programme endings
ABC radio programs
Radio programs based on television series
Horror fiction radio programmes
American science fiction radio programs
Black-and-white American television shows
English-language television shows
American horror fiction television series
American live television series
Science fiction anthology television series